Georges Garreau (20 September 1902 – 21 June 1986) was a French diver. He competed in the men's plain high diving event at the 1924 Summer Olympics.

References

External links
 

1902 births
1986 deaths
French male divers
Olympic divers of France
Divers at the 1924 Summer Olympics
Divers from Paris
20th-century French people